Jedynak is a Polish-language surname. Notable people with the surname include:
Małgorzata Jarosińska-Jedynak (born 1979), Polish statesperson and engineer
 Radosław Jedynak (born 1982), Polish chess Grandmaster
  (1949-2017), Polish politician in Silesia, high-ranking member of Solidarity
 (1919-1987), Polish general

See also
 

Polish-language surnames